Elaine Schwartz Dalton (born November 1, 1946) was the thirteenth president of the Young Women organization of the Church of Jesus Christ of Latter-day Saints (LDS Church) from 2008 to 2013.

Dalton was born in Ogden, Utah. She earned a degree in English from Brigham Young University (BYU).

LDS Church service
At the October 2002 LDS Church general conference, Dalton, who had been serving on the Young Women General Board, was sustained by the church as the second counselor to Susan W. Tanner, the newly-called general president of the Young Women organization. On March 31, 2007, Dalton became Tanner's first counselor when former first counselor Julie B. Beck was released to become the general president of the church's Relief Society. When Tanner was released on April 5, 2008, Dalton succeeded her as the president of the organization. Dalton's counselors were Mary N. Cook and Ann M. Dibb.

In 2009, Dalton spoke at the student body of BYU at their weekly devotional with an address entitled, "Zion Is the Pure in Heart". Dalton has spoken and written on the topics of modesty, chastity, and temples.

In early 2013, Dalton was criticized by some women in the church who were advocating greater church responsibilities for women (including receiving the priesthood). Consistent with current terms of service for church auxiliary presidencies, Dalton and her counselors were released at the April 2013 LDS Church general conference, with Bonnie L. Oscarson succeeding Dalton.

In July 2013, Dalton was appointed as a member of the Board of Trustees of Utah Valley University and from 2015 to 2019 served as the chair.

Personal life
She married Stephen E. Dalton in the Salt Lake Temple on September 13, 1968 and they are the parents of six children. She is an avid runner and has completed more than 15 marathons.

Bibliography
Shine (Deseret Book Company, 4 April 2016) 
No Ordinary Women: Making a Difference through Righteous Influence (Deseret Book Company, 1 August 2016) 
A Return to Virtue (Deseret Book Company, 20 March 2018)

References

External links

"General Auxiliaries: Sister Elaine S. Dalton"
Elaine Dalton Speaking on the Importance of Family Relationships

1946 births
American leaders of the Church of Jesus Christ of Latter-day Saints
Brigham Young University alumni
Counselors in the General Presidency of the Young Women (organization)
General Presidents of the Young Women (organization)
Living people
People from Ogden, Utah
Latter Day Saints from Utah